Dwight Frazer (born 22 December 1967) is a Jamaican boxer. He competed in the men's welterweight event at the 1984 Summer Olympics.

References

1967 births
Living people
Jamaican male boxers
Olympic boxers of Jamaica
Boxers at the 1984 Summer Olympics
Place of birth missing (living people)
Welterweight boxers